The 2007–08 season was Futebol Clube do Porto's 97th competitive season, 74th consecutive season in the top flight of Portuguese football, and 114th year in existence as a football club.

Porto's season began on 11 August 2007 with the Supertaça Cândido de Oliveira. The Azuis e Brancos were defeated by Sporting CP, 1–0. Porto's league campaign began a week later on the 18. Going into the 2007–08 season, Porto were the holders of the Primeira Liga after claiming the league title on the last day of the season. The 2007–08 league campaign saw the Portistas claim a 23rd Portuguese top-flight title on 5 April 2008 over Estrela da Amadora.

Porto competed in the two domestic cups, the Taça de Portugal and the Taça da Liga. In the Taça de Portugal, the Dragões progressed through five rounds to reach the final, where they were defeated by Sporting CP at the Jamor. Porto entered the Taça da Liga in the third round, where they were eliminated by Liga de Honra side Fátima.

In Europe, Porto progressed through a group consisting of Liverpool, Marseille and Beşiktaş to reach the first knockout round. For a second consecutive season, Porto were eliminated at the first knockout round stage as they lost on penalties to German side Schalke after 1–1 scoreline over two legs.

First-team squad

2007-2008 Season
Stats as of the end of the 2007–08 season. Games played and goals scored only refers to appearances and goals in the Primeira Liga.

Key events

May
 25: After five years at the club where he was primarily used as a back up in the full-back position to Nuno Valente, Pedro Emanuel and Ricardo Costa, César Peixoto leaves the Dragões to join Primeira Liga club Braga on a free transfer.
 31: English club Manchester United sign Brazilian midfielder Anderson for €30 million.

June
 2: Porto announce the signing of Brazilian defensive midfielder Fernando from Vila Nova as a replacement for Anderson.
 15: Porto sign Polish midfielder Przemysław Kaźmierczak from Pogoń Szczecin for €1.3 million. Kaźmierczak had been on loan to Portuguese side Boavista during the 2006–07 season where his displays attracted interest from several European clubs.

July
 7: Porto defeat third side division side Tourizense in their first pre-season game of the season. In a match which saw nine goals, the Portistas would six score of those. Porto's goals came from Adriano, Edgar, Hélder Postiga, Ricardo Quaresma and Luis Aguiar, who scored twice.
 10: Spanish club Real Madrid sign Pepe from Porto for €30 million.
 11: In the first game of their tour of the Netherlands, Porto thrash amateur Dutch side Sportclub Irene 10–0.
 14: Porto follow up their thrashing of Sportclub Irene, with a 4–0 victory over second division Den Bosch to claim their third consecutive pre-season win.
 16: Argentine midfielder Mariano González signs for the Portistas from Italian side Palermo on a season-long loan.
 18: Belgian side Genk inflict on the Azuis e Brancos their first defeat of the pre-season campaign.
 19: Serbian defender Milan Stepanov signs from Trabzonspor for fee of €3.4 million.
 21: In Porto's official presentation to its members of their 2007–08 squad, the Dragões defeat French side Monaco, 2–1. Lisandro López and Hélder Postiga scored Porto's goals.
 26: Porto win the Centenarian Atlanta Tournament after claiming two 1–0 victories over Serbian side Red Star Belgrade and tournament hosts Atalanta.

August
 3: Porto start off their last tournament of the pre-season campaign with a 0–0 draw against Feyenoord in the Rotterdam Tournament.
 5: Porto claim a 3–0 a victory over Chinese side Shanghai Shenhua, to win the Rotterdam pre-season tournament.
 11: The Dragões begin their season with a defeat to Sporting CP in the Supertaça Cândido de Oliveira.
 18: Porto start off their 2007–08 league campaign with a 2–1 win away to Braga. Ricardo Quaresma's late free-kick provided the away side with the three points.
 26: Just two weeks after losing the Supertaça Cândido de Oliveira to Sporting CP, Porto defeat the Lisbon side 1–0. Raul Meireles scored Porto's only goal of the game.
 30: Porto draws Beşiktaş, Liverpool and Marseille in the Champions League draw.

September
 27: Porto suffer a shock third round exit at the hands of Fátima in the Taça da Liga. After the match ended 0–0 in normal time, the game proceeded to penalties where Fátima's Marinho scored the winning penalty to send his side through to the next round after Porto's Mariano González missed his spot kick.

October
 29: The Azuis e Brancos defeat Leixões, 3–0 in game week 8 to win their eighth consecutive league game of the campaign.

November

December
 1: Porto defeat Benfica on match day 12. Ricardo Quaresma's 42nd-minute strike gave Porto the victory over the Encarnados to give his team a seven-point lead over their Lisbon rivals.

January
 15: After only two league starts during the first half of the 2007–08 season, Portuguese striker Hélder Postiga moves to Greek side Panathinaikos on a six-month loan.

February
 10: Porto comfortably defeat fourth division side Sertanense 4–0 to progress to the quarter finals of the cup. Ernesto Farías, Tarik Sektioui and Przemysław Kaźmierczak scored Porto's goals.

March

April
 30: Porto renews the contracts of Tarik Sektioui and Leandro Lima. The Moroccan's contract was renewed for another season, whilst Lima's was renewed until 2013.

May

Pre-season and friendlies

Legend

Matches

Competitions

Legend

Overall

Supertaça Cândido de Oliveira

Taça de Portugal

Taça da Liga

UEFA Champions League

Group stage

Round of 16

References

FC Porto seasons
Porto
Portuguese football championship-winning seasons